Governor Gregg may refer to:

Hugh Gregg (1917–2003), 68th Governor of New Hampshire
Judd Gregg (born 1947), his son and 76th Governor of New Hampshire